The École cantonale d'art de Lausanne (ÉCAL) is a university of art and design located in the Renens suburb of Lausanne, Switzerland. It was founded in 1821 and is affiliated with the University of Applied Sciences and Arts of Western Switzerland (HES-SO). The designer Alexis Georgacopoulos is the director of ÉCAL.

Studies 
ÉCAL offers a foundation year, bachelor's, master's, and master's in advanced studies degrees in different fields.

Foundation year

Bachelor 

 Visual Arts
 Cinema
 Graphic Design
 Industrial Design
 Media & Interaction Design
 Photography

Master 

 Visual Arts
 Film Studies, in collaboration with the Haute Ecole d'Art et Design (HEAD) in Geneva
 Product Design
 Photography
 Type Design
 HES-So Innokick (Integrated Innovation for Product & Business Development)

Master of Advanced Studies 

 Design for Luxury & Craftsmanship
 Design Research in Digital Innovation

Notable alumni 
Graduates of ÉCAL include:

 Fabrice Aragno, Swiss director, producer, and cinematographer
 Ini Archibong, Swiss-American artist and designer (ÉCAL adjunct lecturer)
 BIG-GAME (Augustin Scott de Martinville, Elric Petit, and Grégoire Jeanmonod), design company
 Thilo Alex Brunner, Swiss industrial designer
 Jean-Stéphane Bron, Swiss actor and film director
 Michel Charlot, Swiss industrial designer
 Jung-You Choi, Korean designer (Luxury & Craftsmanship)
 , author and illustrator
 Alexis Georgacopoulos (ÉCAL director)
 Christophe Guberan, Swiss product designer
 Moisés Hernández, Mexican designer
 Carmen Jaquier, Swiss film director
 Jonas Kamprad, Swedish designer and entrepreneur 
 Fiona Krüger, watch designer (ÉCAL adjunct lecturer) 
 Maria Jeglinska-Adamczewska, Polish designer (Office for Design and Research)
, Swiss painter and animator
 Bertille Laguet, Swiss product designer
 Nicolas Le Moigne, Swiss designer (ÉCAL faculty)
 Namsa Leuba, Swiss-Guinean art director and photographer
 Catherine Leutenegger, Swiss artist and photographer
 LeviSarha (Sarha Duquesne and Levi Dethier), design studio
 M/M Paris (Mathias Augustyniak and Michael Amzalag studio)
 Romain Mader, Swiss photographer
 Carolien Niebling, Dutch designer
 Rachel Noël, Swiss film director
 Panter & Tourron, design studio
 Louise Paradis, graphic designer
 Léa Pereyre, Dutch costume designer
 Laurence Rasti, photographer
 Julie Richoz, Swiss-French designer (ÉCAL tutor) 
 Adrien Rovero, Industrial designer
 Brynjar Sigurðarson, Icelandic designer
 Annik Troxler, graphic designer
 Hongchao Wang, Chinese designer
 Giorgia Zanellato, Italian designer

Notable faculty 
Partial list of ÉCAL professors:
 Johanna Agerman Ross
 Yves Béhar
 Angelo Benedetto
 Camille Blin
 Ronan and Erwan Bouroullec
 Pierre Charpin
 Kim Colin
 Alexandra Cunningham Cameron
 Konstantin Grcic
 Marva Griffin
 Mette Hay
 Jaime Hayon
 Anniina Koivu
 Max Lamb
 Alberto Meda
 Sabine Marcelis
 Ravi Naidoo
 Hans Ulrich Obrist
 Jonathan Olivares
 Eugenio Perazza
 Alice Rawsthorn
 Inga Sempé
 Wieki Somers
 Deyan Sudjic
 Alexander Taylor
 Skylar Tibbits
 Patricia Urquiola
 Sebastian Wrong

Publications

See also 
 List of universities in Switzerland
 List of art schools
 List of institutions offering type design education

Notes and references

External links 

 Official website
 EPFL+ECAL Lab (Ecole Polytechnique Fédérale de Lausanne design research and innovation centre)
 The ECAL Manual of Style, How to best teach design today? (Exhibition at the Vitra Design Museum)

Universities of Applied Sciences in Switzerland
Art schools in Switzerland
Film schools in Switzerland
Swiss design